Melicope cinerea is a species of plant in the family Rutaceae known by the common name manena.  It is endemic to the Hawaiian Islands.  It is threatened by habitat loss.

References

cinerea
Endemic flora of Hawaii
Biota of Maui
Biota of Oahu
Trees of Hawaii
Waianae Range
Taxonomy articles created by Polbot